The Directorate-General for Antiquities and Museums (DGAM);) is a Syrian government owned agency that is responsible for the protection, promotion and excavation activities in all sites of national heritage in the country. The directorate was established shortly after Syria's independence in 1946 under the central supervision of the Ministry of Culture.

General Overview 
Its tasks emerged during the first years of independence in discovering, preserving, and protecting the data of the Syrian heritage, conducting studies on archaeological finds, and drafting the laws governing this, which were mentioned in the antiquities law and its amendments.

With the development of archaeological work and the increase in discoveries, its tasks expanded and its scientific and administrative responsibilities multiplied to include all cities and regions in the Syrian Arab Republics. 

The progress of archaeological work in the country and highlighting the features of the Syrian civilization.

Nationally: through the rehabilitation of archaeological sites, museum management, seminars, conferences, publications, and publications of a historical and archaeological nature.

Internationally: Through archaeological exhibitions and various international participations through archaeological conferences and forums, and according to the scientific activity of the Directorate General of Antiquities and Museums for more than half a century, it was able to introduce the world to the chapters of the ancient Syrian civilization and added to the history curricula in the world’s universities and research centers ancient Syrian sciences, so it became These universities teach the flourishing prehistoric civilizations in Syria.

Thus, Syria became the focus of the attention of historians, archaeologists, and linguists, due to the data presented by the Syrian land that discredited many people's beliefs about the history of human civilizations in all historical eras known to mankind, because the Syrian land has embraced very important evidence for each era.

In 2012, Prof. Dr. Maamoun Abdulkarim was appointed as director-general until 26 Sep. 2017.

Organization
The Directorate-General is split into several different direct directorates including:
 Directorate of Museum Affairs: Responsible for the management and development of all Syrian museums, in addition to supervising any foreign exhibition of Syrian artefacts.
 Directorate of Excavations and Archaeological Studies: Responsible for the managing, organizing and supervising excavation works inside Syria and cataloging any findings.
 Al-Bassel Center for Archaeological Research and Training: Responsible for the over-all process of research and training, in terms of publications and special-purpose courses.
 Directorate of Planning and Statistics
 Directorate of Historic Buildings
 Directorate of World Heritage Sites
 Directorate of Information Communication & Technology: Responsible for providing the proper tools, infrastructure, and training to develop, manage, and publish databases of museum objects, historical sites and monuments, and spatial information to help decision-makers.

As of 2011, its library contains some 14,000 volumes.

World Heritage List Sites in Syria 

 Ancient City of Damascus
 Ancient City of Bosra
 Site of Palmyra
 Ancient City of Aleppo
 Crac des Chevaliers and Qal’at Salah El-Din
 Ancient Villages of Northern Syria

See also
Directorate General of Antiquities – the comparable government department in Lebanon

References

External links
  

Government of Syria
Archaeology of Syria
Syria, Antiquities And Museum, Directorate General